Neidium is a genus of diatoms belonging to the family Neidiaceae.

The genus has cosmopolitan distribution.

Species:

Neidium acutum 
Neidium affine 
Neidium agonaense

References

Naviculales
Diatom genera